Abbas Akhil is an Indian-American politician and engineer who served as a member of the New Mexico House of Representatives from 2019 to 2021. When he took office on January 15, 2019, Akhil became the first Muslim member of the New Mexico Legislature.

Early life and education 
Born in India, Akhil earned a Bachelor of Science in mechanical engineering from Aligarh Muslim University. He then relocated to New Mexico, where he earned a Master of Science in industrial engineering from New Mexico State University.

Career 
Prior to entering politics, Akhil worked as an engineer at Sandia National Laboratories. In 2017, he ran unsuccessfully for a seat on the Albuquerque Public Schools Board. In 2018, he defeated incumbent Republican Jim Dines to represent the 20th district. In October 2019, Akhil announced that he would not run for re-election in 2020.

References 

21st-century American politicians
Aligarh Muslim University alumni
American Muslims
American politicians of Indian descent
Asian-American people in New Mexico politics
Indian emigrants to the United States
Living people
Democratic Party members of the New Mexico House of Representatives
New Mexico State University alumni
Year of birth missing (living people)